This is a list of Belgian television related events from 1979.

Events

Debuts

Television shows

Ending this year

Births
3 January - Dina Tersago, TV host, actress & model
19 March - Stan Van Samang, actor & singer
21 August - Kevin Janssens, actor
27 December - Ann Van Elsen, model & TV & radio host

Deaths